Plaut v. Spendthrift Farm, Inc., 514 U.S. 211 (1995), was a case in which the Supreme Court of the United States held that Congress may not retroactively require federal courts to reopen final judgments.  Writing for the Court, Justice Scalia asserted that such action amounted to an unauthorized encroachment by Congress upon the powers of the judiciary and therefore violated the constitutional principle of separation of powers.

See also
 Bank Markazi v. Peterson
 United States v. Sioux Nation of Indians
 List of United States Supreme Court cases, volume 514
 List of United States Supreme Court cases
 Lists of United States Supreme Court cases by volume
 List of United States Supreme Court cases by the Rehnquist Court

References

External links
 

United States Constitution Article Three case law
United States Supreme Court cases
United States Supreme Court cases of the Rehnquist Court
1995 in United States case law
United States separation of powers case law